La Fortune des Rougon (The Fortune of the Rougons), originally published in 1871, is the first novel in Émile Zola's monumental twenty-volume series Les Rougon-Macquart. The novel is partly an origin story, with a large cast of characters - many of whom become the central figures of later novels in the series - and partly an account of the December 1851 coup d'état that created the French Second Empire under Napoleon III. The events are experienced through the eyes of a large provincial town in southern France. The title refers not only to the "fortune" chased by protagonists Pierre and Felicité Rougon, but also to the fortunes of the various disparate family members Zola introduces, whose lives are of central importance to later books in the series.

Plot summary
After a stirring opening on the eve of the coup d'état, involving an idealistic young village couple joining up with the republican militia in the middle of the night, Zola then spends the next few chapters going back in time to pre-Revolutionary Provence, and proceeds to lay the foundations for the entire Rougon-Macquart cycle, committing himself to what would become the next twenty-two years of his life's work. The fictional town of Plassans (loosely based on the real city of Aix-en-Provence, where Zola grew up and Lorgues, in the Var, where the insurrectional events described in the novel took place in December 1851) is established as the setting for the novel and described in intimate detail, and then we are introduced to the eccentric heroine Adelaide Fouque, later known as "Tante Dide", who becomes the common ancestor for both the Rougon and Macquart families. Her legitimate son from her short marriage to her late husband, a labourer named Rougon who worked on Dide's land, is forced to grow up alongside two illegitimate children — a boy and a girl — from Dide's later romance with the smuggler, poacher and alcoholic Macquart, while the ageing Dide slides further and further into a state of mental illness and borderline senile dementia. From this premise, the next nineteen novels all get their central protagonists and to a certain extent their themes.

The narrative continues along double lines, following both "branches" of the family. We see Pierre Rougon (the legitimate son) in his attempts to disinherit his Macquart half-siblings, his marriage to Felicité Puech, the voraciously ambitious daughter of a local merchant, and their continued failure to establish the fortune, fame and renown they seek, despite their greed and relatively comfortable lifestyles. Approaching old age, the Rougon couple finally admit defeat and settle, crushed, into their lower middle class destinies, until by a remarkable stroke of luck their eldest son Eugène reports from Paris that he has some news that they might find interesting. Eugène has become one of the closest allies of the future Emperor Napoleon III and informs his parents that a coup is imminent. Having been effectively given insider information about which side to back in the coming revolution, the Rougons then make a series of seemingly bold moves to show their loyal and steadfast support for Napoleon III, winning the admiration of the most influential people in the town, mostly royalists who are themselves afraid of showing too much commitment for fear of backing the "wrong horse" and losing their standing and fortune.

The narrative then switches over to the Macquart side of the family, whose grim working-class struggles to survive are juxtaposed keenly with the Rougons' seemingly trivial quest for greater wealth and influence in genteel drawing-room society. Descended from a drunken ne'er-do-well and a madwoman, Zola effectively predestines the Macquarts to lives of toil and misery. Zola's theories of heredity, laid out in the original preface to this novel, were a cornerstone of his entire philosophy and a major reason for his embarking on the mammoth Rougon-Macquart project in the first place in order to illustrate them. Largely discredited nowadays, the theories are largely "present but unseen" in most of the novels in the Rougon-Macquart cycle, allowing those books to be enjoyed without the overshadowing effect of Zola's somewhat suspect scientific ideas. Due to the original story nature of La Fortune des Rougon, the theories are placed much more to the fore, and can appear somewhat heavy-handed as a result.

A third branch of the family, the Mourets, descended from Macquart and Dide's daughter, are then introduced before the novel's focus is brought back to the "present", the night of the coup, via a quite brilliantly told love story. The idealistic but naïve Silvère Mouret falls madly in love with the innocent Miette Chantegreil, and after a long courtship they decide to join up with the republicans to fight the coup. The rest of the novel then picks up from where the opening chapter left off, and from then on is basically a dual narrative telling the story of the old Rougon couple and their increasingly Machiavellian machinations to get themselves into a position of fortune and respect in Plassans, juxtaposed with Silvère and Miette's continuing love story and the doomed republican militia's disastrous attempt to take the town back. Eventually, the Rougons exploit their half-brother Antoine Macquart into inadvertently helping crush the republican threat, and they achieve their life's ambition, fortune and favour. For Silvère and Miette, who committed themselves so completely to a doomed cause, there can be no such happy ending and Zola wisely leaves their half of the story at a bleak dead end.

Translations
The first English translation by Henry Vizetelly was published in 1886 and extensively revised (to meet Victorian standards of propriety and avoid prosecution for issuing an indecent publication) by Ernest Vizetelly in 1898, issued under the title The Fortune of the Rougons by Chatto & Windus. It is of reasonably poor quality, not helped by Vizetelly's boast that he had changed one in every three sentences in the course of his editing. No other translation was available until 2012, when Brian Nelson published one under the Oxford World's Classics imprint.

 The Fortune of the Rougons (1886, tr. unknown for H. Vizetelly, Vizetelly & Co.)
 The Fortune of the Rougons (1898, tr. unknown edited by E. A. Vizetelly, Chatto & Windus)
 The Fortune of the Rougons (2012, tr. Brian Nelson, Oxford University Press)
Correction:  T. B. Peterson & Brothers published an English translation, done by John Stirling, in 1879.

Adaptations
The novel was adapted into a 1980 French TV miniseries, La fortune des Rougon, directed by Yves-André Hubert and starring Madeleine Robinson as Adelaide and Christian Barbier as the adult Pierre.

References

External links
 (English)
French Language Text
  La Fortune des Rougon, audio version 
 

1871 French novels
Novels by Émile Zola
Books of Les Rougon-Macquart
Fiction set in 1851
Novels set in the 1850s
Novels set in Provence
Chatto & Windus books